Stoney is an impact crater in the Mare Australe quadrangle of Mars, located at 69.8°S  latitude and 138.6°W  longitude. It measures  in diameter and was named after Anglo-Irish physicist George Johnstone Stoney (1826–1911). The name was officially adopted by the International Astronomical Union (IAU) Working Group for Planetary System Nomenclature in 1973.

See also 
 List of craters on Mars

References 

Mare Australe quadrangle
Impact craters on Mars